Ghost in the Shell: Stand Alone Complex, released in Japan as , is a first-person shooter video game based on the cyberpunk anime series Ghost in the Shell: Stand Alone Complex and a sequel to the first Ghost in the Shell: Stand Alone Complex game of the same title, developed by G-Artists and published for the PlayStation Portable by Sony Computer Entertainment and Bandai in 2005. It was released in Japan on September 15, 2005, in Europe on October 21, 2005 distributed by Atari Europe, and in North America on October 26, 2005, but releasing it under the same name as the original PS2 game caused confusion and misinterpretation of it as a port.

Gameplay
Ghost in the Shell features first-person shooter gameplay. Customizable Tachikoma sentient tanks, which can operate independently as AI characters or be ridden inside by players, accompany the player at all times. Playable characters include Motoko Kusanagi, Batou, Togusa, and Saito. All levels can be played by all characters. Aramaki is also available for multiplayer matches. All characters have varying statistics which can affect how a game plays out, for example Batou has more health than other players and Saito holds sniper rifles steadier than others. In addition, Tachikoma robots can act as an AI companion, and players can select from four Tachikoma "characters", balanced, aggressive, intelligent and humorous. Controls are similar to other first person shooter games on the platform, such as Coded Arms and Medal of Honor: Heroes.

Plot

Dealing with similar concepts to other incarnations of Ghost in the Shell, the game has an original storyline which follows on from and refers to the PlayStation 2 game's plotline.

Reception

The game received "mixed" reviews according to the review aggregation website Metacritic. Reviewers generally noted flaws in gameplay and graphics. In Japan, Famitsu gave it a score of 30 out of 40.

References

External links
NAMCO BANDAI Games America Inc. page: PSP

2005 video games
Cavia (company) games
First-person shooters
Ghost in the Shell video games
PlayStation Portable games
PlayStation Portable-only games
Spy video games
Video game
Video games about police officers
Video games developed in Japan
Video games featuring female protagonists
Video game sequels
Video games set in 2030
Multiplayer and single-player video games